The term slide as used in physical geography refers to the fixed or settled residue of a landslide that has stabilized, sometimes in the form of an alluvial fan.  It has become a mostly permanent fixture to the landscape. 

Sedimentology
Geomorphology